United Evangelical Lutheran Churches in India (UELCI) is a communion of twelve Christian denominations in India. It has approximately four million members. It is a member of the World Council of Churches, Christian Conference of Asia, the National Council of Churches in India, the ACT Alliance and Lutheran World Federation. The churches belonging to the UELCI are: 
Andhra Evangelical Lutheran Church
Arcot Lutheran Church
Evangelical Lutheran Church in Madhya Pradesh
Evangelical Lutheran Church in the Himalayan States
Good Samaritan Evangelical Lutheran Church
Gossner Evangelical Lutheran Church in Chotanagpur and Assam
India Evangelical Lutheran Church
Jeypore Evangelical Lutheran Church
Northern Evangelical Lutheran Church
South Andhra Lutheran Church
Tamil Evangelical Lutheran Church

References

External links
Website of the United Evangelical Lutheran Church in India Archive

Lutheran World Federation members
Lutheranism in India
Lutheran denominations established in the 20th century
Affiliated institutions of the National Council of Churches in India